Seciu may refer to several villages in Romania:

 Seciu, a village in the town of Boldești-Scăeni, Prahova County
 Seciu, a village in Fârtățești Commune, Vâlcea County
 Seciu, a village in Chiojdeni Commune, Vrancea County